Norma Helen García Mora Starr (born c. 1943), more commonly known as Norma Mora, is a Mexican actress.

Career
A native of Mexico City, Mora is of Arab, Irish, and Jewish descent. In 1959, she won a beauty contest sponsored by a well known Mexican magazine. She had starring roles in the Viruta and Capulina vehicles Qué perra vida (1963), where she played an antagonist, and Los astronautas (1964), where she played Capulina's Venusian romantic interest, Rauna.

References

External links

1943 births
Actresses from Mexico City
Mexican film actresses
Mexican people of Arab descent
Mexican people of Irish descent
Mexican people of Jewish descent
Living people